Hong Kong competed at the 2017 Asian Indoor and Martial Arts Games held in Ashgabat, Turkmenistan.

Medal summary

Medalists

References

Asian Indoor and Martial Arts Games
Nations at the 2017 Asian Indoor and Martial Arts Games